Tokelau, a dependency of New Zealand, has taken part in the Pacific Games and Pacific Mini Games.

Pacific Games medals

Pacific Mini Games medals

See also
Tokelau at the Commonwealth Games

References

Nations at the Pacific Games
Tokelau at the Pacific Games
Pacific Games
National sports teams of Tokelau